Babhan Jyotia Halt railway station is a halt railway station on Lucknow–Gorakhpur line under the Lucknow NER railway division of North Eastern Railway zone. This is situated beside State Highway 1A at Maskanwa in Gonda district in the Indian state of Uttar Pradesh.

References

Railway stations in Gonda district
Lucknow NER railway division